Theoderich Heinrich August Wilhelm von Dufving (1907–2001), known as Theodor von Dufving, was a German officer of the Wehrmacht during the Second World War.

In May 1945 he was one of the last Germans to enter the Führerbunker, shortly after the death of Adolf Hitler.

Berlin, 1945
A soldier before 1939, Dufving fought on the Eastern Front, where he enjoyed unusually fast promotion and became the Chief-of-Staff to General Helmuth Weidling, the commanding officer of the LVI Tank Corps (LVI Panzerkorps). In 1944, he completed Senior Staff Officers' training at the Prussian Military Academy, and was then assigned as chief of staff of the 76th Panzer Artillery Regiment, with the rank of Colonel.

During the Battle for Berlin, Dufving was again the military Chief-of-Staff to General Helmuth Weidling. On 1 May 1945, after Hitler's suicide on 30 April, the new German Chancellor Joseph Goebbels sent General Hans Krebs and Dufving, under a white flag, to deliver a letter he had written to the Soviet General Vasily Chuikov.  Chuikov, as commander of the Soviet 8th Guards Army, commanded the Soviet forces in central Berlin.  Krebs, having been a fluent Russian speaker, had been brushing up in front of his shaving mirror, but Dufving took a Latvian officer with them as a Russian interpreter.

The letter which Goebbels gave Krebs to deliver to Chuikov contained surrender terms acceptable to Goebbels.  However, Chuikov was not prepared to accept the terms proposed in Goebbels' letter, nor to negotiate with Krebs.  The Soviets were unwilling to accept anything other than unconditional surrender, but Krebs was not authorized by Goebbels to agree to an unconditional surrender, and the meeting ended with no agreement. Both Goebbels and Krebs committed suicide shortly afterwards.

Early the next day, Dufving was sent to arrange for General Weidling to meet General Chuikov. Weidling left for his meeting with Chuikov about one hour before Dufving and his party followed him.

At 5:55 a.m. on 2 May 1945, Dufving, Hans Refior, Siegfried Knappe, and a German Major led a column of roughly one hundred German soldiers to the end of the Bendlerstraße.  Knappe was also a member of Weidling's staff.  The Soviets were waiting for them on the other side of the Landwehr Canal (Landwehrkanal).

The highest-ranking Soviet officer crossed to the German side of the bridge, and Dufving saluted and reported to him.  The Soviet officer spoke to Dufving for a moment and then returned to the other side of the canal, where about two dozen Soviet soldiers with submachine guns were waiting, with several American-made jeeps.  The column of Germans crossed the bridge, walking upright and in single file.  The Soviet soldiers all had big grins on their faces, and one Soviet soldier said "Hitler kaput" to the German prisoners, while the other Soviet soldiers all laughed.

The German prisoners were then transported to the Red Army General Chuikov's headquarters near Tempelhof Airport, where they met General Weidling.  Once inside Chuikov's headquarters, Weidling ordered Knappe to type an order directing all German forces still in Berlin to halt all forms of resistance.

Dufving then began a period of several years as a prisoner of the Russians.

Post-war

Dufving died in 2001.

References
 Antony Beevor, Berlin: The Downfall 1945 (Penguin Books, 2002)
 Erich Kuby, Die Russen in Berlin 1945. 5. Fortsetzung und Schluß, Der Spiegel 24/1965 (http://www.spiegel.de/spiegel/print/d-46272950.html)
 Siegfried Knappe " Soldat"

Footnotes

1907 births
2001 deaths
German prisoners of war in World War II held by the Soviet Union
Officers Crosses of the Order of Merit of the Federal Republic of Germany
German Army officers of World War II